Colonel Hugh Montgomerie, 12th Earl of Eglinton, KT (5 November 1739 – 14 December 1819) was a Scottish peer, politician, soldier and composer.

Biography
Montgomerie was styled Lord Montgomerie from 1769. He sat as a Member of Parliament for Ayrshire off and on from 1780 to 1796. That year he became Lord Lieutenant of Ayrshire, a post he held until his death. In 1794 he raised a fencible regiment, the West Lowland Fencibles of which he was colonel.

In 1798, having previously succeeded to the earldom through his third cousin, he was elected a representative peer and moved to the House of Lords. On 15 February 1806, he was created Baron Ardrossan in the Peerage of the United Kingdom, enabling him to sit the Lords in his own right.
He was made a Knight of the Thistle in 1814.

As large ships were unable to reach Glasgow due to the silting of the River Clyde, Montgomerie promoted and partially funded the Glasgow, Paisley and Ardrossan Canal.  However, funds ran out, and the canal was only constructed from Glasgow to Johnstone via Paisley.
The Glasgow terminus of the canal was at Port Eglinton. Though the wharf is now filled in, the neighbouring Eglinton Street still bears his name. Preparatory work on the canal from the new harbour created at Ardrossan was used as the basis for Glasgow Street, which is the main thoroughfare of the town.

Montgomerie was an amateur composer and cellist. His best-known work is the dance tune "Ayrshire Lasses," and other composers dedicated works to him, including Thomas Arne.

Family 
Montgomerie married Eleanora Hamilton, daughter of Robert Hamilton and Jean Mitchell, around 3 June 1772. They had two sons, and two daughters:

 Maj.-Gen. the Hon. Archibald Montgomerie, Lord Montgomerie (30 July 1773 - 4 Jan 1814)
 The Hon. Roger Montgomerie (d. June 1799) Officer in the Royal Navy.
 Lady Jane Montgomerie (d. 23 Feb 1860) 
 Lady Lilias Montgomerie (d. 10 Sep 1845)

Notes

References

Further reading 

 
 

1739 births
1819 deaths
Knights of the Thistle
Lord-Lieutenants of Ayrshire
Montgomerie, Hugh Montgomerie, Lord
British MPs 1780–1784
British MPs 1784–1790
British MPs 1796–1800
Scottish representative peers
12
Clan Montgomery